Eraso! (Basque: Attack!)  is a Basque metal band from Zarautz, Gipuzkoa, Basque Country, formed in 1996. The band's line-up consists of four members and have released four studio albums all written and sing in Basque.

Biography
After two demos and 150 concerts they recorded their first studio album Erantzunik Gabe (Without An Answer) in 1999, and were selected by Slayer as support band during 2000. Their second album Oraina Eta Geroa (Present And future) recorded more professionally, was an inflection point in their career, during this time they shared stage with bands like Machine Head, Sepultura and Napalm Death. Since then they have released two more albums: Grisez Bustitako Egunak (Grey Dunked Days) nn 2003 and Kontra (Against) in 2005.

Members
 Sergio Ruiz – vocals, guitar
 Nestor Urdanpilleta – guitar
 Ander Izeta – bass
 Iñigo Beitia – drums

Discography
 Erantzunik Gabe (Mil A Gritos, 1999)
 Oraina Eta Geroa (Mil A Gritos, 2001)
 Grisez Bustitako Egunak (Metak, 2003)
 Kontra (Metak, 2005)

Music videos
 "Gertaerak"
 "Aurrera"

External links
Official Website 
MySpace
Metak
Purevolume

Basque music
Musical groups established in 1996